Gary Middle College is a free public 9-12 charter school in Gary, Indiana. Gary Middle College is part of the GEO Foundation. The school has been opened since Fall 2011.

Other schools associated with the GEO Foundation are Fall Creek Academy, Fountain Square Academy, 21st Century Charter School of Gary, and Pikes Peak Prep.

References

External links 
 Gary Middle College

Charter schools in Indiana
Public high schools in Indiana
Schools in Gary, Indiana